Subi is a minor Bantu language of Tanzania, spoken on the southern shore of Lake Victoria. It is not listed in most sources, including Linguasphere. It has at times been confused with Shubi, though the two are not especially closely related.

References

Languages of Tanzania
Great Lakes Bantu languages